Gareth von Hoesslin (born 19 April 1985) is a South African cricketer. He played in 22 first-class and 19 List A matches for Border from 2005 to 2008.

See also
 List of Border representative cricketers

References

External links
 

1985 births
Living people
South African cricketers
Border cricketers
Cricketers from East London, Eastern Cape